The following highways are numbered 329:

Australia
 Holmes Road

Canada
 Nova Scotia Route 329
 Quebec Route 329

China
 China National Highway 329

Costa Rica
 National Route 329

Japan
 Japan National Route 329

United States
  Arkansas Highway 329
  Florida State Road 329
  Georgia State Route 329
  Indiana State Road 329 (former)
  Kentucky Route 329
  Kentucky Route 329 Bypass
  Louisiana Highway 329
  Maryland Route 329
  Minnesota State Highway 329
  New Mexico State Road 329
 New York:
  New York State Route 329
  County Route 329 (Erie County, New York)
  Ohio State Route 329
  Pennsylvania Route 329
  Puerto Rico Highway 329
  South Carolina Highway 329
  Tennessee State Route 329
 Texas:
  Texas State Highway 329
  Farm to Market Road 329
  Virginia State Route 329